The Compaq 171FS computer monitor is sometimes referred to as MicroScan 5A after the internal microprocessor-based digital control system.  It was manufactured by the Compaq Computer Corporation in 1994 and is 17 inches with a maximum display resolution of 1024x768, 75 Hz refresh rate, and dot pitch of 0.28 mm. the monitor is both PC- and Macintosh-compatible (with a Mac PnP adapter).

The input video signal to the monitor is analog through a HD-15 connector.  The horizontal sync frequency is 30–58 kHz, and the vertical frequency is 50-100 Hz.

The monitor consumes a maximum of 100 watts, and qualified as EnergyStar by the United States Environmental Protection Agency (EPA).

References

http://www.eServiceInfo.com : MicroScan 5A Service Manual (Part 1, Part 2)

Compaq monitors